The Stop Online Piracy Act (SOPA) and PROTECT IP Act (PIPA) have found broad support from organizations that rely on copyright, including the Motion Picture Association of America, the Recording Industry Association of America, Macmillan Publishers, Viacom, and various other companies and unions in the cable, movie, and music industries.

On 22 December 2011, Lamar Smith, the bill's sponsor, released a list of 142 organizations that support SOPA on the House Judiciary Committee's website. Other lists have been released by the organizations themselves.

Following the list's original release, it was updated multiple times. As of the morning of 29 December 2011, the official list had 18 fewer supporters, including only 124 of the original 142 supporters. The growing publicity of this list on websites such as Reddit resulted in what might be referred to as a public relations disaster for some of the supporters listed. Arguably the first and most prominent case regarded GoDaddy.com, a popular internet domain registrar and web hosting company which openly supported SOPA. GoDaddy sustained significant losses, losing over 72,000 domains in less than one week, as a result of a proposed boycott of their services, pending it renounce its support of SOPA. GoDaddy has since announced that it "no longer supports SOPA legislation," then amended that statement to "GoDaddy OPPOSES SOPA."

Organizations supporting SOPA

Organizations that support the Stop Online Piracy Act include:

 60 Plus Association
Actors' Equity Association
 ABC
 Alliance for Safe Online Pharmacies (ASOP)
 American Bankers Association (ABA)
 American Federation of Musicians (AFM)
 American Federation of Television and Radio Artists (AFTRA)
 American Society of Composers, Authors and Publishers (ASCAP)
 Americans for Tax Reform
 Artists and Allied Crafts of the United States
 Association of American Publishers (AAP)
 Association of State Criminal Investigative Agencies
 Association of Talent Agents (ATA)
 Best Host News (BHN)
 BMI
 BMG Rights Management
 Building and Construction Trades Department
 Capitol Records Nashville
 CBS
 Cengage Learning
 Christian Music Trade Association
 Church Music Publishers' Association
 Coalition Against Online Video Piracy (CAOVP)
 Comcast
 NBCUniversal
 Concerned Women for America (CWA)
 Congressional Fire Services Institute
 Copyhype
 Copyright Alliance
 Coty, Inc.
 Council of Better Business Bureaus (CBBB)
 Council of State Governments
 Country Music Association
 Country Music Television
 Creative America
 Deluxe Digital Studios
 Directors Guild of America (DGA)
 Disney Publishing Worldwide, Inc.
 Elsevier
 Entertainment Consumers Association
 ESPN
 Estée Lauder Companies
 Foundation for Job Creation
 Fraternal Order of Police (FOP)
 Gospel Music Association
 Hachette Book Group
 HarperCollins Publishers Worldwide, Inc.
 Hyperion Books
 Independent Film & Television Alliance (IFTA)
 Information Technology and Innovation Foundation (ITIF)
 International Alliance of Theatrical and Stage Employees (IATSE)
 International AntiCounterfeiting Coalition (IACC)
 International Brotherhood of Electrical Workers (IBEW)
 International Brotherhood of Teamsters (IBT)
 International Trademark Association (INTA)
 International Union of Police Associations
 L'Oréal
 Lost Highway Records
 Macmillan
 Major County Sheriffs
 Major League Baseball
 Majority City Chiefs
 Marvel Entertainment, LLC
 MasterCard Worldwide
 MCA Records
 McGraw-Hill Education
 Mercury Nashville
 Minor League Baseball (MiLB)
 Minority Media & Telecom Council (MMTC)
 Motion Picture Association of America (MPAA)
 Moving Picture Technicians
 MPA – The Association of Magazine Media
 National Association of Manufacturers (NAM)
 National Association of Prosecutor Coordinators
 National Association of State Chief Information Officers
 National Basketball Association (NBA) 
 National Cable & Telecommunications Association (NCTA)
 National Center for Victims of Crime
 National Criminal Justice Association
 National District Attorneys Association
 National Domestic Preparedness Coalition
 National Football League (NFL)
 National Governors Association, Economic Development and Commerce Committee
 National League of Cities
 National Narcotics Officers' Associations' Coalition
 National Sheriffs' Association (NSA)
 National Songwriters Association
 National Troopers Coalition
 News Corporation
 Pearson Education
 Penguin Group (USA), Inc.
 Pharmaceutical Research and Manufacturers of America (PhRMA)
 Pfizer, Inc.
 Provident Music Group
 Random House
 Raulet Property Partners
 Republic Nashville
 Revlon
 Scholastic, Inc.
 Screen Actors Guild (SAG)
 SESAC
 Showdog Universal Music
 Sony/ATV Music Publishing
 Sony Music Entertainment
 Sony Music Nashville
 State International Development Organization (SIDO)
 The National Association of Theatre Owners (NATO)
 Perseus Books Group
 United States Conference of Mayors
 Tiffany & Co.
 Time Warner
 True Religion Brand Jeans
 UMG Publishing Group Nashville
 United States Chamber of Commerce
 United States Conference of Catholic Bishops
 United States Olympic Committee
 United States Tennis Association
 Universal Music
 Universal Music Publishing Group
 Viacom
 Visa Inc.
 W.W. Norton & Company
 Wallace Bajjali Development Partners, L.P.
 Warner Music Group
 Warner Music Nashville
 Wolters Kluwer Health
 Word Entertainment
 Zuffa, LLC
 Zumba Fitness, LLC

Note: 125 Organizations are listed.

Removed supporting organizations

Organizations that have had their names removed from the list of supporters of the Stop Online Piracy Act include:

 Apple Inc.
 Baker & Hostetler LLP
 Beachbody, LLC
 Covington & Burling LLP
 Cowan, DeBaets, Abrahams & Sheppard LLP
 Cowan, Liebowitz & Latman, P.C.
 Davis Wright Tremaine LLP
 EMI
 Entertainment Software Association (ESA)
 Go Daddy
 Graphic Artists Guild
 Irell & Manella LLP
 Jenner & Block LLP
 Kelley Drye & Warren LLP
 Kendall Brill & Klieger LLP
 Kinsella Weitzman Iser Kump & Aldisert LLP
 Lathrop & Gage LLP
 Loeb & Loeb LLP
 Mitchell Silberberg & Knupp LLP
 Morrison & Foerster LLP
 Patterson Belknap Webb & Tyler LLP
 Phillips Nizer, LLP
 Proskauer Rose LLP
 Robins, Kaplan, Miller & Ciresi LLP
 Shearman & Sterling LLP
 Simpson Thacher & Bartlett LLP
 Skadden, Arps, Slate, Meagher & Flom LLP

Note: 27 organizations are listed.
(based on comparison between original 142 count list and current list as of 29 December 2011).

Organizations opposing SOPA

 38 Studios
 4chan
 7iber.com
 Amazon.com
 American Association of Law Libraries
 American Civil Liberties Union
 American Library Association
 Americans for Job Security
 American Society of News Editors
 Anonymous
 AOL
 Ars Technica
 Association of College and Research Libraries
 Association of Research Libraries
 Benetech
 BoardGameGeek 
 BoingBoing
 Brookings Institution
 BuzzFeed
 Center for Democracy and Technology
 Cheezburger Network
 Cliche Games
 CloudFlare
 Competitive Enterprise Institute
 Computer & Communication Industry Association
 Consumer Electronics Association
 Consumer Federation of America
 Consumers Union
 cPanel
 Craigslist
 Creative Commons
 Creators' Freedom Project
 The Daily Californian
 Daily Kos
 The Daily WTF 
 Demand Progress
 Democracy for America
 Democratic Underground 
 Destructoid
 DeviantArt
 Diaspora 
 Dinosaur Comics
 Disqus
 Domain.com
 Don't Censor the Net
 DreamHost
 DuckDuckGo
 eBay
 Educause
 Encyclopaedia Metallum
 Engine Advocacy
 Entertainment Consumers Association
 Electronic Frontier Foundation
 Embedly
 Epic Games
 ESET
 Etsy
 Facebook
 Fark
 Fight for the Future
 Flickr
 foursquare
 Freedom House
 Freepress.org
 Frozenbyte
 Funny or Die 
 Future of Music Coalition 
 The Ginever Alliance
 GigaOM 
 Girls with Slingshots 
 GitHub
 Gizmodo
 Good Magazine
 Good Old Games
 Google
 Greenpeace
 Grooveshark
 Hack a Day 
 Hacker News
 Harvard Law School
 Heritage Action for America
 The Heritage Foundation 
 HostGator
 Hover
 The Huffington Post
 The Hype Machine
 IAC
 identi.ca
 IGN
 Imgur
 Information Technology Industry Council
 Institute for Intellectual Property & Social Justice
 Internet Archive
 Internet Society
 Irregular Times
 Kaspersky Lab
 Kickstarter
 Know Your Meme 
 Kornspace
 Lea-Linux
 Library Copyright Alliance
 LinkedIn
 Linode
 Los Angeles Times
 MAAWG
 Major League Gaming
 The Massachusetts Daily Collegian
 Massachusetts Institute of Technology Admissions
 McSweeney's
 Media Access Project
 Media Temple
 Megaupload
 Mercury Radio Arts
 MetaFilter
 Microsoft
 Middlebury College
 Minnesota Daily
 Miro
 Mojang
 MoveOn.org
 Mozilla Foundation
 NameCheap
 Name.com
 National Association of the Deaf
 NetCoalition.com
 New America Foundation's Open Technology Initiative
 Newgrounds
 The New York Times
 Nintendo
 Nival
 NVIDIA
 The Oatmeal
 The Obama Administration
 The Oklahoma Daily
 OpenDNS
 The Orange County Register
 Open Rights Group 
 O'Reilly Media
 PayPal
 PerezHilton.com 
 Petzel
 Pop17 
 Pornhub 
 PPF (Open Congress)
 The Pirate Bay
 Public Interest Registry
 Public Knowledge
 phpBB
 Questionable Content 
 Quora
 Rackspace
 Rate Your Music
 The Raw Story
 Razer
 Red 5 Studios
 Red Hat
 Reddit
 Reporters Without Borders
 Riot Games
 Rock, Paper, Shotgun
 Runic Games
 San Jose Mercury News
 SaveHosting.org
 Scribd
 ServInt
 SiteGround
 A Small Orange
 A Softer World
 Something Positive 
 SongMeanings
 SparkFun Electronics 
 Special Libraries Association
 Surviving the World 
 The Spectrum
 Square
 Stack Exchange/Stack Overflow
 StopBadware
 Syracuse University School of Information Studies
 Tea Party Patriots
 TechAmerica
 TechCrunch
 Techdirt
 TechFreedom
 Texts From Last Night 
 Tor
 TorrentFreak
 Trion Worlds
 Tucows
 Tumblr
 Turntable.fm
 Twitpic
 Twitter
 The Verge/Vox Media
 UrbanDictionary
 U.S. PIRG The Federation of State PIRGs
 United States Student Association
 Urbanspoon 
 Vimeo
 WebOS Internals
 Wikia
 Wikimedia Foundation
 Wired
 WordPress
 World Wide Web Virtual Library
 Writers Guild of America, West
 xda-developers
 XVideos
 Yahoo!
 Y Combinator
 Zynga

Note: 224 Organizations are listed.

For a complete list, see http://www.sopastrike.com/on-strike/

See also

 English Wikipedia blackout
 Freedom of information
 List of US Congresspersons who support or oppose SOPA/PIPA
 Trans-Pacific Partnership

References

Internet law in the United States
United States proposed federal intellectual property legislation
Internet access
SOPA and PIPA
United States federal computing legislation
Computer law organizations
Domain Name System
Copyright enforcement